Zhang Jianting is a Chinese boxer who won bronze at the Asian Championships 2006 at middleweight.
He also won the Asian Championships 2009.

External links
Results 2006
AsianChampionships2009

Living people
Middleweight boxers
Asian Games medalists in boxing
Boxers at the 2006 Asian Games
Boxers at the 2010 Asian Games
Chinese male boxers
Asian Games bronze medalists for China
Medalists at the 2006 Asian Games
Year of birth missing (living people)
21st-century Chinese people